The Regulation to Prevent and Combat Child Sexual Abuse (Child Sexual Abuse Regulation, or CSAR) is a European Union regulation proposed by the European Commissioner for Home Affairs Ylva Johansson on 11 May 2022. It aims to prevent child sexual abuse online. The regulation would establish a framework that would require digital platforms to detect and report CSAM rather than making the practice voluntary as is the case prior to this regulation.

Groups opposed to this proposal often highlight that it would impose "Chat Control" mandatorily for all messenger and email services.

References

External links 

 Commission Press Release on the regulation
 Proposal for a REGULATION OF THE EUROPEAN PARLIAMENT AND OF THE COUNCIL laying down rules to prevent and combat child sexual abuse

Draft European Union laws
European Digital Strategy
Policies of the European Union
Data laws of Europe
European Union regulations
Child pornography law
Information privacy